Luis Álvarez Roure (born 1976) is a Puerto Rican realist painter based in New Jersey. He is known for his figure paintings as well as his portraits of American public figures such as Philip Glass, Joshua Bell, Paul Volcker, Cándido Camero, Monsignor William Linder, and Octavio Vázquez.
His strengths have been described as "his draftsmanship (...) taken directly from the paintings of past masters" and "the empathy he so evidently feels with his sitters" by Peter Trippi, editor-in-chief of Fine Art Connoisseur Magazine.

Life

Luis Alvarez Roure was born in Arecibo, Puerto Rico. As a child, he taught himself to draw. He declined taking formal art lessons. He also developed a great interest in music and his father enrolled him in piano lessons. Eventually, he moved to New York City to study piano performance under Germán Diez at City University of New York, where he completed a Master of Arts in Music. He then enrolled at the Art Students League of New York where he studied with Nelson Shanks. According to Roure, seeing his teacher paint was a turning point. Roure is a resident of Hasbrouck Heights, N.J.

Career

Alvarez Roure's work has been collected by the Smithsonian National Portrait Gallery in Washington D.C., European Museum of Modern Art in Barcelona, Steinway Hall in New York City, and the Federal Reserve in Washington D.C.

In 2019 he was a finalist of the Outwin Boochever Portrait Competition, where his painting Hidden Wounds was one of 46 works exhibited at The Outwin: American Portraiture Today at the Smithsonian National Portrait Gallery.

Works

References

Sources
Trippi, Peter (2018). "Luis Alvarez Roure: Composing in Paint". Fine Art Connoisseur. November/December issue 2018, p. 80-83.

External links
 

1976 births
Living people
Puerto Rican painters
Puerto Rican artists
20th-century American painters
American male painters
21st-century American painters
Art Students League of New York alumni
People from Arecibo, Puerto Rico
People from Hasbrouck Heights, New Jersey
20th-century American male artists